South Tarogong is a district of Garut Regency which serves as its seat. The district was established in 2003 as a division of the old Tarogong district. It is divided into 12 villages which are as follows:
Cibunar
Haurpanggung
Jayaraga
Jayawaras
Kersamenak
Mekargalih
Pataruman
Sukabakti
Sukagalih
Sukakarya
Sukajaya
Tarogong

Of the 12 villages, 5 (Jayawaras, Pataruman, Sukagalih, Sukakarya and Sukajaya) are classed as urban kelurahan and 7 classed as rural desa.

Climate
Tarogong has an elevation moderated tropical monsoon climate (Am) with moderate rainfall from June to September and heavy rainfall from October to May.

References 

Garut Regency
Populated places in West Java
Regency seats of West Java